Henry S. "Hen" Moore (ca. 1862 - June 3, 1902) was a 19th-century major league left fielder. He played for the Washington Nationals of the Union Association in 1884. 

Moore replaced 16-year-old Chick Carroll as the team's starting left fielder early in the season. His .820 fielding percentage in the outfield was slightly above the league average. He finished third in the league in hits (155), batting average (.336), and on-base percentage (.362), and led the league in games played (111) and singles (126).

Moore had a quick temper, and was blacklisted by multiple major and minor leagues during his career for unsportsmanlike conduct, including refusing to field balls hit to his position, and refusing to run the bases after hits.

References

External links 
 
 Retrosheet

19th-century baseball players
Major League Baseball left fielders
Washington Nationals (UA) players
Reading Actives players
Norfolk (minor league baseball) players
Washington Nationals (minor league) players
Atlanta Atlantas players
1902 deaths